Gerald 'Jerry' Bennett (born August 15, 1956) was an American politician and businessman who was a member of the Montana House of Representatives for the 1st district from 2009 to 2017.

Early life 
Bennett was born in Fairbanks, Alaska. His grandfather and father lived in Lincoln County, Montana. In 1974, Bennett graduated from Libby High School in Libby, Montana.

Career 
Bennett has worked for companies including St. Regis Paper Co., W.R. Grace, Taylor Logging, Sunrise Rental, Valley Motor and S.J. Orr Service. As a businessman, he owned and operated a septic service and portable toilet rental business.

On November 4, 2008, Bennett won the election and became a Republican member of Montana house of representatives for District 1, which includes Libby. He defeated Eileen J. Carney and Freeman W. Johnson with 59.65% of the votes.
On November 2, 2010, as an incumbent, he won the election and continued representing District 1 by defeating Eileen J. Carney with 71.34% of the votes.
On November 6, 2012, as an incumbent, he won the election unopposed. On November 4, 2014, he won the election again and defeated Donald Coats with 75.68% of the votes.

Bennett was a majority whip during the 2015–2016 session.

On November 8, 2016, Bennett was elected as a member of Lincoln County Commission for the 2nd district. He defeated Rhoda Cargill.

Personal life 
Bennett's wife is Malia Bennett. They have two children, Coby and Amy. Bennett and his family live in Libby, Montana.

See also 
 Montana House of Representatives, District 1

References

External links 
 Gerald Bennett at Ballotpedia
 Gerald A. Bennett Our Campaigns
 Jerry Bennett at Montana Republican Legislative Campaign Committee website
 Jerry Bennett mentioned as logging for Taylor Logging in Russell D. Remp's obituary at schnackenbergfh.com

1956 births
Living people
Republican Party members of the Montana House of Representatives
People from Fairbanks, Alaska
People from Libby, Montana